Bernard McLean (1 May 1884 - 11 December 1955) was a member of the Queensland Legislative Assembly.

Biography
McLean was born at Maryborough, Queensland, the son of Bernard McLean Snr and his wife Mary Ann (née Orr). He was educated at Maryborough Central State School and Maryborough Grammar School before working as a miner in the district. From 1909 until 1936 he worked for the Queensland Railways as a railway guard.

On the 3rd Nov 1909 McLean married Gertrude Lewis (died 1969) and together had a son and two daughters. He died in Brisbane in December 1955.

Public career
Following the retirement of the long-serving George Barber at the 1935 Queensland state election, McLean, a fellow Labor Party member, won the seat of Bundaberg in the Queensland Legislative Assembly. He represented the electorate for six years, losing in 1941 to the Andrew Fisher Labourite, Frank Barnes.

References

Members of the Queensland Legislative Assembly
1884 births
1955 deaths
Australian Labor Party members of the Parliament of Queensland
20th-century Australian politicians